Caligula's "Giant Ship", also known as the "Round Ship", was a very large barge, the ruins of which were found during the construction of Rome's Leonardo da Vinci International Airport in Fiumicino, Italy. This was previously a Roman port a few kilometres north of Ostia at the mouth of the Tiber River. The ship was dated to  using dendrochronological dating methods.

It was six decks high, displaced a minimum of 7,400 tons, and carried a crew of 700–800.

See also 
Caligula
Nemi ships

Notes

External links
The Museum of the Roman Ships: The Port of Claudius, Giulia Boetto, translated by Claire Calcagno, Museum of the Roman Ships, Ministry of the Cultural Activities and Heritage Archaeological Superintendency of Ostia
Wrecks & shipfinds of the Mediterranean 2. Antiquity after 480 BC, Per Åkesson, rev aug '05, Wrecks & shipfinds Worldwide, Nordic Underwater Archaeology.

Barges
Ancient Roman ships
Ancient shipwrecks
Shipwrecks of Italy
Archaeological discoveries in Italy
Caligula